A Twenty20 International (T20I) is a form of cricket, played between two of the international members of the International Cricket Council (ICC), in which each team faces a maximum of twenty overs. The matches have top-class status and are the highest T20 standard. Wicket-keepers plays an important role in T20I cricket and, over time, the role has evolved into a specialist position.

Mushfiqur Rahim holds the record of most dismissals, stumpings and catches for Bangladesh in T20Is as a wicket-keeper.

This is a chronological list of Bangladesh T20Is wicket-keepers.

This list only includes players who have played as the designated keeper for a match. On occasions, another player may have stepped in to relieve the primary wicket-keeper due to injury or the keeper bowling.

See also 
 List of Bangladesh Test wicket-keepers
 List of Bangladesh Twenty20 International cricketers

References 

Twenty20 International wicket-keepers
Lists of wicket-keepers